Universities and colleges affiliated with the Churches of Christ include these institutions:

* Florida College has a loose affiliation with the churches of Christ (non-institutional), in that those on its board of trustees must all be members. It does not accept funding from churches.

Affiliated with the Churches of Christ universities no longer in operation include these institutions:

References

 
Churches of Christ
Universities and colleges affiliated Churches of Christ